A la Hispanidad or the Monument to Hispanidad (Spanish: Monumento a la Hispanidad) is an instance of public art in Madrid, Spain. The sculptural group is an allegory of the "meeting" of two civilizations.

History and description 
It is located in front of the Museum of the Americas in the Ciudad Universitaria campus. Opened on June 5, 1971, during a ceremony attended by the then Prince Juan Carlos de Borbón, it is a work by Agustín de la Herrán Matorras, a Spanish sculptor. It was part of a wider initiative of the Francoist regime for the construction of memorials in the Spanish capital trying to complement its programme of Ibero-American cooperation with symbolical content, also featuring other works dedicated to the likes of Simón Bolívar, José de San Martín, José Gervasio Artigas, Vasco Núñez de Balboa, Rubén Darío or Andrés Bello. 

The sculptural group represents an old holm oak trunk featuring three distinctive elements on its upper part: a Spanish warrior mounted on his horse helping to raise an indigenous woman, representing the Americas. On the back of the sculpture, there's an inscription alluding to the inauguration of the monument.

The ensemble has been described as "thoroughly flawed" as well as evocative of "the violence of abduction".

References
Citations

Bibliography
 
 

Monuments and memorials in Madrid
Buildings and structures in Ciudad Universitaria neighborhood, Madrid
Sculptures of women in Spain
Equestrian statues in Madrid
Sculptures of men in Spain
Outdoor sculptures in Madrid